Edward Simpson ("Flint Jack") (born 1815) was a British geologist and forger of antiquities, such as arrowheads and fossils. He was also known as Fossil Willy, Old Antiquarian, Cockney Bill, Bones, and Shirtless. Other names included John Wilson, of Burlington, and Jerry Taylor, of Billery-dale, Yorkshire Moors.

Biography
Edward Simpson was born in 1815 in the village of Sleights in North Yorkshire. At a young age he became apprenticed to local geologist and historian Dr. George Young,  working first as a fossil collector before entering the world of forgery in 1843. The first of Edward Simpson's many aliases, and his first venture into forgery, is believed to have come about when he met a Mr Dotchon in Whitby. Dotchon showed Simpson his first flint arrow head and asked if he could copy it.  Thus, Flint Jack was born.

In 1846, Jack began drinking heavily and is quoted as saying: "In this year, I took to drinking; the worst job yet. Till then, I was always possessed of five pounds. I have since been in utter poverty, and frequently in great misery and want."

Recent work has suggested that the antiquarian biographies of Edward Simpson may be based on misinformation provided by Simpson himself.

Forgeries
Replica flint tools made by Simpson were sold nationally and have entered into the collections of several regional and national museums. As well as flints and fossils, Jack made and sold fake ancient British and Roman urns. He initially used Bridlington clay but, finding the cliffs of Bridlington Bay unsuitable, moved to Stainton Dale, between Whitby and Scarborough. He travelled, on foot, for many miles selling his 'collections' that he claimed had been found on the Yorkshire moors. He is also reported to have successfully sold a genuine-looking Roman breastplate (pectorale) in Malton, made out of an old tea-tray and fashioned on his own body.

In London in 1859, Jack was accused of forgery by Professor Tennant. The professor, fascinated by the hard-to-detect forgeries, persuaded Jack to describe his manufacturing methods to members of the Geological and Archaeological Societies.

Notoriety
Edward's reputation following his incarceration in 1867, as recorded in the Whitby Gazette:
After moving to London, Flint Jack sold artefacts to museums and other serious collections across the country, including numerous pieces to the British Museum itself. 
Flint Jack – A notorious Yorkshireman – one of the greatest impostors of our times – was last week sentenced to 12 months imprisonment for felony at Bedford. The prisoner gave the name of Edward Jackson, but his real name is Edward Simpson, of Sleights, Whitby, although he is equally well known as John Wilson, of Burlington, and Jerry Taylor, of Billery-dale, Yorkshire Moors. Probably no man is wider known than Simpson is under his aliases in various districts – viz. 'Old Antiquarian', 'Fossil Willy', 'Bones', 'Shirtless','Cockney Bill', and 'Flint Jack', the latter name universally. Under one or other of these designations Edward Simpson is known throughout England, Scotland and Ireland – in fact, wherever geologists or archaeologists resided, or wherever a museum was established, there did Flint Jack assuredly pass off his forged fossils and antiquities. He imbibed, however, a liking for drink, and he admits that from that cause his life for 20 years past has been one of great misery. To supply his cravings for liquor he set about the forging of both fossils and antiquities about 23 years ago. In 1859, during one of his trips to London, Flint Jack was charged by Professor Tennant with the forgery of antiquities. He confessed, and was introduced on the platform of various societies, and exhibited the simple mode of his manufacture of spurious flints.

As news of Jack's forgeries spread, his business suffered badly. An 1871 edition of The Antiquary warned of his presence in a North Yorkshire and noted that "His present trade is the vending of arrow-heads made of bottle-glass, which he works with even more skill than flint, and which he is disposing of by the score", warnings were also published of his presence in Stamford where he was making flints, monastic seals and rings, and noted his incarceration for a month at Northallerton.

The last known sighting of Flint Jack was in Malton magistrates court on 21 February 1874.

Exhibition
An exhibition of Flint Jack's forgeries formed part of the Yorkshire Sculpture International 2019 art exhibition. The exhibition, held in the Henry Moore Institute was created by the artist Sean Lynch and titled 'The Rise and Fall of Flint Jack'.

In popular culture
The American alternative rock band, Monks of Doom, produced a record about Flink Jack, called Forgery. The lyrics celebrate Simpson's anti-hero status.

See also
 Forgery
 Archaeological forgery
 List of people from Yorkshire

References

External links

1815 births
Forgers
People from Sleights
Archaeology of the United Kingdom
Year of death missing
19th century in England
Criminals from Yorkshire